The 1983 French Open was a tennis tournament that took place on the outdoor clay courts at the Stade Roland Garros in Paris, France. The tournament ran from 23 May until 5 June. It was the 87th staging of the French Open, and the first Grand Slam tennis event of 1983.

Finals

Men's singles

 Yannick Noah defeated  Mats Wilander, 6–2, 7–5, 7–6(7–3) 
It was Noah's 3rd title of the year, and his 14th overall. It was his 1st (and only) career Grand Slam title.

Women's singles

 Chris Evert defeated  Mima Jaušovec, 6–1, 6–2 
It was Evert's 15th career Grand Slam title, and her 5th French Open title.

Men's doubles

 Anders Järryd /  Hans Simonsson defeated  Mark Edmondson /  Sherwood Stewart, 7–6(7–4), 6–4, 6–2

Women's doubles

 Rosalyn Fairbank /  Candy Reynolds defeated  Kathy Jordan /  Anne Smith, 5–7, 7–5, 6–2

Mixed doubles

 Barbara Jordan /  Eliot Teltscher defeated  Leslie Allen /  Charles Strode, 6–2, 6–3

Prize money

Total prize money for the event was FF9,782,133.

References

External links
 French Open official website

 
1983 Grand Prix (tennis)
1983 Virginia Slims World Championship Series
1983 in French tennis
1983 in Paris